Eileen Saxon, sometimes referred to as "The Blue Baby", was the patient in an operation that ushered in the modern era of cardiac surgery.

She had a condition called Tetralogy of Fallot, one of the primary congenital defects that lead to blue baby syndrome. In this condition, defects in the great vessels and wall of the heart lead to a chronic lack of oxygen in the blood. In Eileen's case, this made her lips and fingers turn blue, with the rest of her skin having a very faint blue tinge. She could only take a few steps before beginning to breathe heavily.

On November 29, 1944, Saxon was the first living human to receive a groundbreaking operation. (now known as a Blalock-Thomas-Taussig shunt) suggested by pediatric cardiologist Helen B. Taussig and administered by Alfred Blalock, with Vivien Thomas, who had perfected the surgery in laboratory tests on animals, standing over his shoulder to advise him on performing the surgery.

The surgery had been designed and first performed on laboratory dogs by Thomas, who taught the technique to Blalock. Although Thomas perfected the technique, he could not perform the surgery because he was not a doctor.

The surgery was not completely successful, since Eileen Saxon became cyanotic again a few months later. Another shunt was attempted on the opposite side of the chest, but she died a few days afterwards, very close to her second birthday. Though Saxon died, she lived long enough to demonstrate that the operation would work. The team later discovered the operation worked best in older children. Saxon herself could not have waited any longer. By the time the first shunt was attempted on her, she was in danger of dying.

The 2004 movie produced by HBO, Something The Lord Made, is a dramatic documentary based on the Saxon baby operation.

References

1942 births
1945 deaths
Cardiac surgery
American children
Child deaths